School District 5 Southeast Kootenay is a school district in British Columbia. It covers the southeast corner of the province up to the Alberta and Montana borders. This includes the major centres of Cranbrook, Fernie, Elkford, and Sparwood.

History
School District 5 was formed in 1996 by the amalgamation of School District 1 Fernie and School District 2 Cranbrook.

Schools

Defunct 
 Muriel Baxter Elementary School (Cranbrook, British Columbia) closed December 31, 2007 because of declining student population. (Last day of classes June 2008)
 Max Turyk Elementary School (Fernie, British Columbia) closed June 30, 2007 because of declining student population.
 Mountain View Elementary School (Sparwood, British Columbia) closed June 30, 2008
 Elkford Elementary School (Elkford, British Columbia) closed in early 2000s and purchased by the District of Elkford in 2007. The building was destroyed by an electrical fire that same year.

See also
List of school districts in British Columbia

East Kootenay
Cranbrook, British Columbia
05